Hajji Shahzada is a citizen of Afghanistan who was held in extrajudicial detention in the United States Guantanamo Bay detention camps, in Cuba.
Shahzada's Guantanamo Internment Serial Number was 952.
Joint Task Force Guantanamo counter-terrorism analysts estimate that Shahzada was born in 1959, in Belanday, Afghanistan.

Guantanamo detainee Abdullah Mohammad Khan's Combatant Status Review Tribunal dossier contains a letter from Shahzada. 
Khan was arrested while he was a guest of Shahzada.

Combatant Status Review Tribunal

Initially the Bush administration asserted that they could withhold all the protections of the Geneva Conventions to captives from the war on terror.  This policy was challenged before the Judicial branch. Critics argued that the USA could not evade its obligation to conduct a competent tribunals to determine whether captives are, or are not, entitled to the protections of prisoner of war status.

Subsequently the Department of Defense instituted the Combatant Status Review Tribunals.  The Tribunals, however, were not authorized to determine whether the captives were lawful combatants—rather they were merely empowered to make a recommendation as to whether the captive had previously been correctly determined to match the Bush administration's definition of an enemy combatant.

Summary of Evidence memo
A Summary of Evidence memo was prepared for Haji Shah Zada's Combatant Status Review Tribunal, on 12 January 2005.
The memo listed the following allegations against him:

Transcript
Shahzada chose to participate in his Combatant Status Review Tribunal.
On March 3, 2006, in response to a court order from Jed Rakoff the Department of Defense published a nine-page summarized transcripts from his Combatant Status Review Tribunal.

Determined not to have been an Enemy Combatant
The Washington Post reports that Shahzada was one of 38 detainees who was determined not to have been an enemy combatant during his Combatant Status Review Tribunal.
They report that Shahzada has been released.
The Department of Defense refers to these men as No Longer Enemy Combatants.

References

Guantanamo detainees known to have been released
Living people
1959 births
Year of birth uncertain